Enjoy the View is an album by American jazz vibraphone and marimba player Bobby Hutcherson. The record was released on June 24, 2014 via the Blue Note label and was Hutcherson's final studio album released before his death on August 15, 2016.

Track listing

Personnel
Bobby Hutcherson – vibraphone
David Sanborn – alto saxophone
Joey DeFrancesco – trumpet, organ
Billy Hart – drums

References 

2014 albums
Blue Note Records albums
Bobby Hutcherson albums